Parliamentary elections were held in Cuba on 20 January 2008 to elect members of the National Assembly of People's Power. According to the Cuban electoral system, one candidate was nominated for each of the 614 seats in the Assembly, and candidates were elected if they received at least 50% of the vote. The candidates are otherwise proposed by nominating assemblies, which comprise representatives of workers, youth, women, students and farmers as well as members of the Committees for the Defense of the Revolution, after initial mass meetings soliciting a first list of names. The final list of candidates is drawn up by the National Candidature Commission taking into account criteria such as candidates' merit, patriotism, ethical values and revolutionary history.

The date of the election was announced on 20 November 2007. It was considered uncertain whether the ailing Fidel Castro would run for the Assembly, which he had to do in order to continue as President; it emerged in early December that he had been nominated for a seat. Since his illness began in 2006, Raúl Castro had been acting president.

Results
María Esther Reus, the president of the National Electoral Commission and Minister of Justice, announced the results of the election on 24 January 2008. Turnout in the election was placed at 96.89%, with 8,231,365 voters participating; 95.24% of the votes cast (7,839,358) were valid. 91% of voters (7,125,752) cast a united ballot for all candidates, while 9% (713,606) chose to vote only for certain candidates. Of the invalid votes, 3.73% (306,791) were blank and 1.04% (85,216) were spoiled. The newly elected Assembly met for the first time on 24 February.

Raúl Castro was re-elected from the 2nd Eastern Front with 99.37% of the vote and Fidel Castro was re-elected from the 7th District of Santiago de Cuba with 98.26% of the vote. Vice-President Carlos Lage and President of the Assembly Ricardo Alarcón respectively won their seats with 92.40% and 93.92% of the vote.

Aftermath
On 24 February 2008, the National Assembly began sitting for its new term, and Raúl Castro was elected President  Alarcón was elected as president of the National Assembly, while Jaime Crombet Hernández Vaquero was elected as its vice-president and Miriam Brito was elected as its secretary.

See also
Liaena Hernandez Martínez

References

Cuba
2008 in Cuba
Parliamentary elections in Cuba
Single-candidate elections
January 2008 events in North America